Hermaea bifida is a species of sacoglossan sea slug, a shell-less marine opisthobranch gastropod mollusk in the family Hermaeidae.

Distribution
The type locality for this species is the coast of Devon, South West England, United Kingdom. It occurs also in the North Atlantic Ocean and in the Caribbean Sea.

References

 Gofas, S.; Le Renard, J.; Bouchet, P. (2001). Mollusca. in: Costello, M.J. et al. (Ed.) (2001). European register of marine species: a check-list of the marine species in Europe and a bibliography of guides to their identification. Collection Patrimoines Naturels. 50: pp. 180–213

External links 
 http://www.seaslugforum.net/hermbifi.htm

Hermaeidae
Gastropods described in 1815